This is a list of protected areas of Bangladesh. Bangladesh is a country in South Asia.

Bangladesh protected areas
As of 2022, the World Database of Protected Areas lists 51 protected areas in Bangladesh, including:
 Altadighi National Park
 Bangabandhu Safari Park Cox Bazar
 Bangabandhu Safari Park Gazipur
 Baroiyadhala National Park
 Barshijora Eco-Park
 Bhawal National Park
 Chadpai Wildlife Sanctuary
 Char Kukri-Mukri Wildlife Sanctuary
 Chunati Wildlife Sanctuary
 Dhangmari Wildlife Sanctuary
 Dudhmukhi Wildlife Sanctuary
 Dudpukuria-Dhopachari Wildlife Sanctuary
 Fasiakhali Wildlife Sanctuary
 Hazarikhil Wildlife Sanctuary
 Himchari National Park
 Inani National Park
 Kadigarh National Park
 Kaptai National Park
 Khadim Nagar National Park
 Kuakata Ecopark 
 Lawachara National Park
 Madhupur National Park
 Madhutila Eco Park
 Marine Reserve
 Medhakachhapia National Park
 Mirpur Botanic Garden
 Nagarbari-Mohanganj Dolphin Sanctuary
 Nawabganj National Park
 Nazirganj Dolphin Sanctuary
 Nijhum Dweep National Park
 Pablakhali Wildlife Sanctuary
 Rajeshpur Eco-Park
 Ramsagar National Park
 Rema-Kalenga Wildlife Sanctuary
 Sangu Matamuhari
 Satchari National Park
 Shilanda-Nagdemra Dolphin Sanctuary
 Singra National Park
 Sitakunda Eco-Park
 Sonarchar Wildlife Sanctuary
 The Sundarbans
 St. Martin's Island Marine Protected Area
 Sundarbans East Wildlife Sanctuary
 Sundarbans South Wildlife Sanctuary
 Sundarbans West Wildlife Sanctuary
 Sundarbans Reserved Forest
 Swatch of No Ground Marine Protected Area
 Tanguar Haor
 Teknaf Game Reserve
 Tengragiri Wildlife Sanctuary
 Tilagor Eco Park

The 1990 edition of the IUCN Directory of South Asian Protected Areas says the Forest Department also established a center for the protection of waterfowl at Hail Haor Wildlife Sanctuary.

References

 
Bangladesh
01
Protected areas